Donnchadh Ó Laoghaire (born 8 February 1989) is an Irish Sinn Féin politician who has been a Teachta Dála (TD) for the Cork South-Central constituency since the 2016 general election. 

Ó Laoghaire is from Togher, Cork. He attended University College Cork and graduated with a law degree. While in UCC, he joined Sinn Féin's youth wing Ógra Shinn Féin, eventually taking a year out to work as an organiser for Ógra. He then worked as a parliamentary assistant for Sinn Féin politicians David Cullinane, Trevor Ó Clochartaigh and Sandra McLellan.
 
While working as McLellan's parliamentary assistant, he ran in the 2014 Cork County Council election, and was elected, serving as a member of Cork County Council from 2014 to 2016. He was re-elected at the 2020 general election. As of 2021, he is Sinn Féin's spokesperson for Education.

In April 2021, Ó Laoghaire settled a defamation claim against RTÉ for over €150,000 following comments made about Ó Laoghaire on Liveline.

Ó Laoghaire is married to Eimear Ruane-McAteer. The couple married in 2021 and have three children.

References

External links
Donnchadh Ó Laoghaire's page on the Sinn Féin website

Living people
Local councillors in County Cork
Members of the 32nd Dáil
Sinn Féin TDs (post-1923)
1989 births
Members of the 33rd Dáil